Hesperocharis is a genus of butterflies in the family Pieridae. They are native to the Americas.

Species
 Hesperocharis anguitia (Godart, 1819)
 Hesperocharis costaricensis H. W. Bates, 1866 – Costa Rican white
 Hesperocharis crocea H. W. Bates, 1866 – orange white
 Hesperocharis emeris (Boisduval, 1836) – emeris White
 Hesperocharis erota (Lucas, 1852)
 Hesperocharis graphites H. W. Bates, 1864 – marbled white
 Hesperocharis hirlanda (Stoll, [1790])
 Hesperocharis leucania (Boisduval, 1836)
 Hesperocharis marchalii (Guérin-Méneville, [1844]) – Marchal's white
 Hesperocharis ñambii Salazar & Constantino, 2007
 Hesperocharis nera (Hewitson, 1852) – Nera white
 Hesperocharis nereina Hopffer, 1874 – nereina white
 Hesperocharis paranensis Schaus, 1898

References

External links

 
 

Anthocharini
Pieridae of South America
Pieridae genera
Taxa named by Baron Cajetan von Felder